Thailand competed at the 2012 Summer Olympics in London, from 27 July to 12 August 2012. This was the nation's fifteenth appearance at the Olympics, except the 1980 Summer Olympics in Moscow because of its partial support to the United States boycott.

The National Olympic Committee of Thailand sent the nation's smallest delegation to the Games since 1996. A total of 37 athletes, 19 men and 18 women, competed in 15 sports. Among the sports played by the athletes, Thailand marked its Olympic debut in slalom canoeing, and also, its Olympic return in archery and rowing after an eight-year absence. Four athletes received their spots in athletics and swimming by wild card entries, while the other Thai athletes won their spots by participating in various qualifying matches around the world. Four Thai athletes made their fourth Olympic appearance: pistol shooter Jakkrit Panichpatikum (the oldest athlete of the team, at age 39), badminton players Boonsak Ponsana and Saralee Thoungthongkam, and table tennis player Nanthana Komwong. Breaststroke and medley swimmer Nuttapong Ketin, the youngest male athlete of the team, was the nation's flag bearer at the opening ceremony.

Thailand, however, failed to win an Olympic gold medal for the first time since 1992, but left London with only two silver and two bronze. Taekwondo jin Chanatip Sonkham managed to repeat the nation's Olympic medal by taking the bronze in women's flyweight division. Other medals were awarded to the athletes in weightlifting, and in boxing, won by Kaeo Pongprayoon from the men's light-flyweight division.

Medalists

Archery

Thailand has qualified one male archer.

Athletics

Thai athletes have so far achieved qualifying standards in the following athletics events (up to a maximum of 3 athletes in each event at the 'A' Standard, and 1 at the 'B' Standard):

Key
 Note – Ranks given for track events are within the athlete's heat only
 Q = Qualified for the next round
 q = Qualified for the next round as a fastest loser or, in field events, by position without achieving the qualifying target
 NR = National record
 N/A = Round not applicable for the event
 Bye = Athlete not required to compete in round

Men

Women

Badminton

Boxing

Thailand has already qualified 3 boxers at the 2012 Summer Olympics.

Men

Canoeing

Slalom

Cycling

Road

Equestrian

Eventing

Judo

Thailand has qualified 1 judoka

Rowing

Thailand has qualified the following boats.

Women

Qualification Legend: FA=Final A (medal); FB=Final B (non-medal); FC=Final C (non-medal); FD=Final D (non-medal); FE=Final E (non-medal); FF=Final F (non-medal); SA/B=Semifinals A/B; SC/D=Semifinals C/D; SE/F=Semifinals E/F; QF=Quarterfinals; R=Repechage

Sailing

Thailand has qualified 1 boat for each of the following events

Men

Women

M = Medal race; EL = Eliminated – did not advance into the medal race;

Shooting

Thailand's Sutiya Jiewchaloemmit has ensured a quota place for Thailand in the women's skeet event.

Men

Women

Swimming

Thai swimmers have so far achieved qualifying standards in the following events (up to a maximum of 2 swimmers in each event at the Olympic Qualifying Time (OQT), and potentially 1 at the Olympic Selection Time (OST)):

Men

Women

Table tennis 

Thailand has qualified the following athletes.

Taekwondo

Pen-Ek Karaket has ensured a quota place for Thailand in the men's −58 kg by reaching the top 3 of the 2011 WTF World Qualification Tournament.

Weightlifting

Thailand has qualified 3 men and 4 women.

Men

Women

References

External links

Summer Olympics
Nations at the 2012 Summer Olympics
2012